WMH may refer to:

Medicine

White matter hyperintensity (leukoaraiosis), an abnormality within the white matter of the brain
World Mental Health survey initiative, a project by the World Health Organization

Places

Wayne Memorial Hospital, Goldsboro, North Carolina
Wayne Memorial Hospital, Honesdale, Pennsylvania
William & Mary Hall, Williamsburg, Virginia

Radio stations
WMH (1921–23), an AM station in Cincinnati, Ohio which operated from 1921-1923
WKRC (AM), an AM station in Cincinnati, Ohio which was assigned these call letters in 1924-1925

Other entities
Water management hierarchy
Williams Murray Hamm